Bernhard Greulich (4 December 1902 – 4 March 1995) was a German athlete. He competed in the men's hammer throw at the 1936 Summer Olympics.

References

External links
 

1902 births
1995 deaths
Athletes (track and field) at the 1936 Summer Olympics
German male hammer throwers
Olympic athletes of Germany
Sportspeople from Mannheim